The 2022 Albanian Supercup was the 29th edition of the Albanian Supercup, an annual Albanian football match. The teams were decided by taking the trophy winners of the previous season's Kategoria Superiore champions and the winners of the Albanian Cup.

The match was contested by Tirana, champions of the 2021–22 Kategoria Superiore, and Vllaznia, the 2021–22 Albanian Cup winners.

Details

See also
2021–22 Kategoria Superiore
2021–22 Albanian Cup

Notes

References

2022
Supercup
December 2022 sports events in Europe